Black Lives Matter is a political and social movement protesting racism and police brutality against black people.

Black Lives Matter may also refer to:

 Black Lives Matter Global Network Foundation, an organization dedicated to activism activities in the Black Lives Matter movement

Arts, entertainment, and media

Music
 "Black Lives Matter", a 2020 single by BeBe Winans
 "Black Lives Matter", a 2020 single by Dax (rapper)

Street art

 Black Lives Matter Plaza, a pedestrian street in Washington, District of Columbia, United States
 Black Lives Matter street mural (Capitol Hill, Seattle), Washington, United States
 Black Lives Matter street mural (Cincinnati), Ohio, United States
 Black Lives Matter street mural (Indianapolis), Indiana, United States
 Black Lives Matter street mural (Portland, Oregon), United States
 Black Lives Matter street mural (Salt Lake City), Utah, United States
 Black Lives Matter street mural (Santa Cruz, California), United States
 Black Lives Matter street mural (Seattle City Hall), Washington, United States
 Black Lives Matter street mural (Springfield, Massachusetts), United States

See also
 BLM (disambiguation)